seyed Shah Hussain Murtazavi is a politician and a journalist from Afghanistan. He is the deputy spokesman for President Ashraf Ghani and is one of the media activists.

seyed Shah Hussain Murtazavi has completed his higher education in the field of International relations.

References 

Living people
Hazara politicians
Year of birth missing (living people)